Kobus is a genus containing six species of African antelopes, all of which are associated with marshes, floodplains, or other grassy areas near water. They are sexually dimorphic, with females being smaller and lacking the horns of the males.

Species
 Genus Kobus

References

^
Mammal genera
Taxa named by Charles Hamilton Smith